Don Luis González Torres de Navarra, Marquess of Campoverde, was a famous Spanish military leader during the Peninsular War. He was involved in battles such as the Battle of Mollet and the Battle of El Pla.

References
 Història de la Guerra del Francès a Catalunya. 
 Glover, Michael. The Peninsular War 1807-1814. London: Penguin, 2001. 
 Smith, Digby. The Napoleonic Wars Data Book. London: Greenhill, 1998. 

Spanish generals
Spanish commanders of the Napoleonic Wars